"Here with Me" is an R&B song by American singer-songwriter Arika Kane, released as a single from her eponymous debut studio album, Arika Kane (2010). "Here with Me" was written and produced by Arika Kane, Lou Humphrey and Carey Mellers. It spent four weeks on the Billboard R&B/Hip-Hop Songs chart and peaked at number sixty-nine.

Track listing
Digital download
"Here With Me" – 4:07
"Ring My Bell" (Radio) – 4:40
"Ring My Bell" (House) – 3:52
"Ring My Bell" (House Extended) – 7:24
"Ring My Bell" (Instrumental) – 7:19
"Ring My Bell" (Acapella) – 4:48

Charts

Release history

References

2010 debut singles
Arika Kane songs
2010 songs